Repton School Ground is a cricket ground in Repton, Derbyshire, England, owned by Repton School and used by the school's teams. The ground has hosted a single List A match, when Derbyshire faced Middlesex in a 40-over Refuge Assurance League match in 1988. Middlesex fielded first, and bowled the hosts out for 130 off 37.1 overs, despite Steve Goldsmith's 61. Angus Fraser returned figures of 8-2-8-3. Rain curtailed the match during the Middlesex reply with the score at 32/0 after 10.2 overs, and, as insufficient overs had been bowled according to the competition rules, the match was considered a no result.

The ground is also used by Derbyshire for 2nd XI and youth fixtures. Derbyshire Women have played two Women's County Championship matches at Repton, in 2011 and 2012.

References

External links
 Cricinfo Website - Ground Page
 Cricket Archive page

Cricket grounds in Derbyshire